This is a list of Hispanic and Latino Americans who have served in the United States Congress. Persons included are identified as having a lineage from Spain or Latin America, a definition that includes Brazil, but not Portugal.

Entries shaded in gray refer to current members of the U.S. Congress.

Senate

Elected, but not seated

House of Representatives

House delegates (non-voting members) 
(Note: Delegates are organized first in chronological order according to their first term in office, then second in alphabetical order according to their surname.)

See also 

 Congressional Hispanic Caucus
 Congressional Hispanic Conference

References 

 
Hispanic and Latino Americans